The 1987 World Taekwondo Championships were the 8th edition of the World Taekwondo Championships, and were held in Barcelona, Spain from October 7 to October 11, 1987, with 434 athletes participating from 62 countries.

Medal summary

Men

Women

Medal table

References
WTF Medal Winners 

World Championships
Taekwondo Championships
World Taekwondo Championships
International taekwondo competitions hosted by Spain
1987
Taekwondo in Spain